Calatrava may refer to:

Spain
 Calatrava la Vieja (originally Calatrava), Spanish medieval town
 Calatrava la Nueva, Spanish medieval castle and convent
 Colegio de Calatrava, college founded in Salamanca by the military orders that still exists

Philippines
 Calatrava, Negros Occidental, a municipality in the Philippines
 Calatrava, Romblon, a municipality in the Philippines

People
 Santiago Calatrava (born 1951), Spanish architect, sculptor and engineer

Other
 Patek Philippe Calatrava, wristwatch brand
 Order of Calatrava, a Spanish military-religious order